Molendinar is a mixed-use suburb in the City of Gold Coast, Queensland, Australia.

Geography 
The suburb is bounded by Smith Street to the north, Olsen Avenue to the east, the Southport Nerang Road to the south and Pacific Motorway to the west.

The land use is a mixture of residential areas and industrial areas.

History 

Jerringan is the Aboriginal name for the area meaning stringybark tree.

The suburb takes its name from the former Molendinar railway station on the South Coast railway line (opened in 1889 and closed in 1964). The railway station in turn was named after a farm selected by George Hope named after Molendinar Burn, a stream which once flowed through central Glasgow in Scotland. Ernest Junction railway station was another former railway station on the South Coast line in the north of the present-day suburb.

The area was known as Silver Bridle in the 1960s. Molendinar incorporated a previous suburb known as Ernest on its northern range until 2003 when it was separated and renamed as Parkwood. 

The Molendinar Industrial Estate was a Queensland Government project supported by the Gold Coast City Council which commenced development beginning in 1969.

Trinity Lutheran Primary School opened at Cotlew Street, Ashmore, on 27 January 1981.

Trinity Lutheran College (a secondary school) opened on 28 January 1987 as Ashmore Road in Molendinar. 

In 2002 the two Lutheran schools merged to form Trinity Lutheran College (a primary and secondary school) operating on two campuses at Cotlew Street in Ashmore and Ashmore Road in Molendinar.

On 2 April 2012, an official dedication of the Lynne Richardson Community Centre was held by the Gold Coast City Council.

The median age of people in Molendinar was 36 years.

Heritage listings 

There are a number of heritage sites in Molendinar, including at 797 Ashmore Road: Ernest Junction Railway Tunnel  The tunnel is another remnant of the South Coast line. The tunnel has a length of 110 metres. Graffiti on the tunnel walls is permitted as long as the area remains clean.

Education 
Trinity Lutheran College is a private primary and secondary school for boys and girls which operates its  primary (Prep-5) campus at 641 Ashmore Road. In 2017, the school (both campuses combined) had an enrolment of 1,050 students with 85 teachers (76 full-time equivalent) and 62 non-teaching staff (35 full-time equivalent).

There are no government schools in Molendinar. The nearest government primary school is Ashmore State School in neighbouring Ashmore or Nerang State School in Nerang. The nearest government secondary school is Keebra Park State High School in Southport or Nerang State High School in Nerang.

Amenities 
Lynne Richardson Community Centre is at 2A Gidgee Court.

References

Sources

External links

 

Suburbs of the Gold Coast, Queensland